Lacibacter daechungensis is a Gram-negative, aerobic, rod-shaped, non-spore-forming and motile bacterium from the genus of Lacibacter which has been isolated from deep freshwater from the Daechung reservoir in Korea.

References

External links
Type strain of Lacibacter daechungensis at BacDive -  the Bacterial Diversity Metadatabase

Chitinophagia
Bacteria described in 2013